The Keles is a river of southern Kazakhstan (Turkistan Region) and for a short stretch near the town Keles also in Uzbekistan. It is a right tributary of the Syr Darya.

References

Rivers of Kazakhstan
Rivers of Uzbekistan